Rogozinikha is a rural locality (a village) in Malyginskoye Rural Settlement, Kovrovsky District, Vladimir Oblast, Russia. The population was 26 as of 2010.

Geography 
Rogozinikha is located 21 km north of Kovrov (the district's administrative centre) by road. Babikovka is the nearest rural locality.

References 

Rural localities in Kovrovsky District